KPDF-CD, virtual channel 41 (UHF digital channel 22), is a low-powered, Class A Canal de la Fe-affiliated television station in Phoenix, Arizona, United States. The station is owned by HC2 Holdings, and is carried on several cable systems in the Phoenix area.

History
KPDF-CD began as an original construction permit for station K69HJ, issued on June 14, 1995, to World Television, a subsidiary of Venture Technologies Group, LLC. In October 1997, the FCC granted the station a modification to its permit to construct facilities on channel 41, with new callsign K41EN. The station was licensed on October 20, 1999, and shortly thereafter, took the call letters KPSW-LP.

The station was an affiliate of Home Shopping Español (HSE), likely from sign-on in 1999 until HSE was shut down in 2002. The station is also listed as an ACN affiliate (now Jewelry TV); presumably for the last half of 2002 and the first half 2003. In July 2003, the station became an Azteca America affiliate.

The station's license was converted to Class A in October 2001, and in May 2002, Venture Technologies sold KPSW-CA, along with stations KPHZ (now KTAZ) and KPHZ-LP (now KDTP-LP), to Telemundo. The following December, Telemundo acquired stations KHRR and KDRX-CA (later KDPH-LP) from Television Apogeo, a company owned by Roy Disney. As part of payment for the stations, Telemundo transferred KPSW-CA to Television Apogeo. In August 2003, the FCC approved the sale of KPSW-CA to Una Vez Mas, and in January 2004, the sale was consummated and KPSW-CA became KPDF-CA.

As a low power TV station, KPDF-CA continued broadcasting in analog after June 12, 2009, which was the end of the digital TV conversion period for full-service stations. Viewing this station required either a pass through converter box, a splitter, or use of cable or satellite.

On June 4, 2010, KPDF-CA flash-cut its signal from analog to digital. The station was licensed for digital operation on May 28, 2015.

News operation
In early 2007, KPDF was to start a local newscast, which will be produced in Davenport, Iowa by the Independent News Network. The station planned on having at least one reporter on duty in the Phoenix area filing news reports for the new news program.

Digital television

Digital channels

See also
 KQBN-LP and KDFQ-LP, co-owned LPTV stations in the Sun City and Prescott areas carrying Azteca America
 KHDF-CD, co-owned Azteca America affiliate for Las Vegas, Nevada

References

External links
 Una Vez Mas
 List of low power TV stations in Phoenix, AZ
 
 Station Index: KPDF-CA
 Station license from the FCC (document always shows current licensee)
 Backchannel Media DRTV Research: KPDF-CA
 Phoenix Business Journal: Mexican TV network now in Phoenix (misidentifies station as channel 43)
 AZCentral.com: World staying tuned to Mexican telenovelas
 Phoenix Business Journal: Spanish-language TV outlets boost power, viewers

PDF-CD
Television channels and stations established in 1995
PDF-CD
Low-power television stations in the United States
Innovate Corp.